What You See Is What You Get is the autobiography of British businessman and TV personality Lord Alan Sugar. The 640-page book, which was published in May 2011, tells the story of Alan Sugar's birth and childhood in a deprived part of London, how he founded the company Amstrad aged just 21 years old, and how he eventually became a multi-millionaire tycoon, received a knighthood, and was appointed to the House of Lords. Sugar also reveals his main method of business and entrepreneurial activity: (a) observing what market leaders are doing, (b) making better and cheaper products than the market leaders, and (c) not focusing on the exclusive or more expensive parts of the market, rather selling to the mass market.

Further reading 
 Thomas, David. Alan Sugar — the Amstrad Story (1991), paperback .

2010 non-fiction books
Autobiographies
Books about businesspeople
British autobiographies